Gustav-Siegle-Haus is a music venue located in Stuttgart. The building was completed in 1912 by architect Theodor Fischer. The structure was rebuilt between 1953 and 1954 by architect Martin Elsaesser after it was destroyed by air raids during World War II. Past performers include Scorpions, Motörhead and AC/DC.

References

External links
Official Website

Buildings and structures in Stuttgart
Music venues in Germany
Tourist attractions in Stuttgart